Pi Delta Kappa was a regional collegiate sorority operating in Ohio from 1907 to 1913. The sorority planned to become a national organization, but ultimately absorbed itself into Chi Omega.

History 
The Alpha chapter was created with eleven members at Ohio University in 1907. Beta chapter, from Gamma Alpha Chi at Miami University, followed in 1909. That same year, at the University of Cincinnati, Professor Howell Lindley (Phi Delta Theta) and an unnamed female professor chartered the Gamma chapter. Lindley assisted his chapter with the petition to Chi Omega.

Pi Delta Kappa was recognized by national fraternities, at least to be mentioned in their respective publications. Sigma Alpha Epsilon and Delta Delta Delta are but two of the groups that recorded the growth of Pi Delta Kappa. An authority on fraternities in the US, Baird's Manual of American College Fraternities (1912 edition), covering Pi Delta Kappa, specifies the three chapters have a combined total of 75 members. Pi Delta Kappa was grouped with "Women's General Fraternities," which included the contemporary members of the National Panhellenic Conference.

The sorority's eventual absorption into Chi Omega was included in noteworthy publications, including Banta's Greek Exchange (1913).

Insignia 
According to Baird's Manual, 1912 edition: The official magazine was The Hour Glass. The official colors were Old gold and Seal brown, and the official badge was an owl wearing a mortarboard with the sorority's letters.

Chapters
Chapters of Pi Delta Kappa at the time of the merger were as follows. All were active, and each was accepted as a new chapter for Chi Omega:

References 

 Ferguson, Christelle. A History of Chi Omega. Chi Omega, 1928.
 Martin, Ida Shaw. The Sorority Handbook. George Banta Publishing Co., 1919.
 Anson, Jack L., Robert F. Marchesani, and William Raimond Baird. Baird's Manual of American College Fraternities. 7th. ed.. New York: College Fraternity Pub., 1912.
 Anson, Jack L., Robert F. Marchesani, and William Raimond Baird. Baird's Manual of American College Fraternities. 8th. ed. New York: Baird's Manual Foundation, 1915.
 G. Banta. Banta's Greek Exchange, v. 2 (1912–1913). George Banta, 1913.
 The Record of Sigma Alpha Epsilon, vol. 32, 1912.
 The Triangle of Sigma Sigma Sigma, vol. 12-13, 1912-1913.
 The Trident of Delta Delta Delta, vol. 23, 1913-1914.

External links 
 Chi Omega Official Website

Defunct fraternities and sororities
1907 establishments in Ohio
Student organizations established in 1907